America's Top States For Business CNBC, a division of NBC Universal, has been ranking state business climates annually since 2007. According to information compiled by CNBC, both from private industry sources, as well as State and Federal agencies, there have been increases and decreases in many U.S State's economies. Specifically, there have been sizable changes in state population, state GDP per capita, unemployment rates, foreclosure rates, budget gaps, and corporate tax rates. CNBC's state rankings are based on 10 categories: Cost of Doing Business, Workforce, Quality of Life, Infrastructure, Economy, Education, Technology & Innovation, Business, Friendliness, Access to Capital, and Cost of Living.

 Virginia was ranked as No. 1 on CNBC's "America's Top States For Business 2011".

CNBC: "America's Top States For Business 2011"

Previously in the 2010 report, Virginia was ranked as number 2 and in the 2009 report, Virginia was ranked as number 1. Virginia's current Governor is Bob McDonnell (R). The state's population is 8,001,024, with a GDP (2009 per capita) of $46,609. The unemployment rate as of May 2011 is 6.0 percent, the foreclosure rate as of May 2011 is one per 766 households, and the projected budget gap for 2012 is $2.0 billion. Also the corporate tax rate is 6.0 percent, and the largest employers are Northrop Grumman, Food Lion, and Booz Allen Hamilton.

Texas was ranked as No. 2 on CNBC's "America's Top States For Business 2011".

CNBC: "America's Top States For Business 2011"

North Carolina was ranked as No. 3 on CNBC's "America's Top States For Business 2011".

CNBC: "America's Top States For Business 2011"

Georgia was ranked as No. 4 on CNBC's "America's Top States For Business 2011".

CNBC: "America's Top States For Business 2011"

Colorado was ranked as No. 5 on CNBC's "America's Top States For Business 2011".

CNBC: "America's Top States For Business 2011"

References 

 U.S. Government
 Internal Revenue Service
 RealtyTrac
 Center on Budget and Policy Priorities
 Federation of Tax Administrators
 CNBC: America's Top States for Business

External links 
 

Economy of the United States